Berrien County is the name of two counties in the United States, both named for John M. Berrien:

 Berrien County, Georgia 
 Berrien County, Michigan